Saku Kinnunen (born January 3, 1995) is a Finnish ice hockey player. He is currently playing with Västerviks IK in the Finnish Hockeyallsvenskan.

Kinnunen made his Liiga debut playing with KalPa during the 2013–14 Liiga season.

References

External links

1995 births
Living people
Finnish ice hockey forwards
Hokki players
Iisalmen Peli-Karhut players
Mikkelin Jukurit players
KalPa players
People from Kuhmo
Västerviks IK players
Sportspeople from Kainuu